A body of knowledge (BOK or BoK) is the complete set of concepts, terms and activities that make up a professional domain, as defined by the relevant learned society or professional association. It is a type of knowledge representation by any knowledge organization. Several definitions of BOK have been developed, for example:

 "Structured knowledge that is used by members of a discipline to guide their practice or work." "The prescribed aggregation of knowledge in a particular area an individual is expected to have mastered to be considered or certified as a practitioner." (BOK-def). Waite's pragmatic view is also worth noting (Ören 2005): "BOK is a stepping stone to unifying community" (Waite 2004).
 The systematic collection of activities and outcomes in terms of their values, constructs, models, principles and instantiations, which arises from continuous discovery and validation work by members of the profession and enables self-reflective growth and reproduction of the profession (Romme 2016).
 A set of accepted and agreed upon standards and nomenclatures pertaining to a field or profession (INFORMS 2009). 
 A set of knowledge within a profession or subject area which is generally agreed as both essential and generally known (Oliver 2012).

A body of knowledge is the accepted ontology for a specific domain. A BOK is more than simply a collection of terms; a professional reading list; a library; a website or a collection of websites; a description of professional functions; or even a collection of information.

A landscape of practice (LoP) refers to a number of related communities of practice (CoPs) working on a body of knowledge. Participation in a LoP involves members of the CoPs developing competence in their area of interest and keeping up to date with knowledgeability relevant to the LoP.

Examples
The following are examples of bodies of knowledge from professional organisations:
 Business Process Management Common Body of Knowledge (BPMCBOK) from the Association of Business Process Management Professionals International (ABPMP)
 Business Analysis Body of Knowledge (BABOK) from the International Institute of Business Analysis     (IIBA)
 Business Architecture Body of Knowledge (BIZBOK) from the Business     Architecture Guild
 Business Relationship Management Body of Knowledge (BRMBOK) from the Business Relationship Management Institute
 Canadian IT Body of Knowledge (CITBOK) – for Canadian Information Processing Society
 Civil Engineering Body of Knowledge
 Common Body of Knowledge (CBK) – for international information security professionals
 Data Management Body of Knowledge (DMBOK) - for the profession of data management from DAMA International, The Global Data Management Community
 Enterprise Architecture Body of  Knowledge (EABOK) – for the enterprise architecture (EA) discipline
 Geographic Information Science and Technology Body of  Knowledge (GISTBoK) – for the geospatial realm
 Industrial Engineering Body of Knowledge (IEBOK) – for the profession of industrial engineering
 Project Management Body of Knowledge (PMBOK) – from the Project Management Institute (PMI) for project management
 Product Management Body of Knowledge (ProdBOK Guide) – from the Association of International Product Marketing & Management (AIPMM) for product professionals
 Scrum Body of Knowledge (SBoK) – for the agile project/product management
 Software Engineering Body of Knowledge (SWEBOK) – for the profession of software engineering
 Systems Engineering Body of Knowledge (SEBOK) – for the profession of systems engineering

See also
 Core curriculum
 Landscape of practice

References

 
Knowledge representation
Knowledge